Phaseolidae is a family of bivalves belonging to the order Nuculanida.

Genera:
 Lametila Allen & Sanders, 1973
 Phaseolus Monterosato, 1875

References

Nuculanida
Bivalve families